Escoredo is one of fifteen parishes (administrative divisions) in Pravia, a municipality within the province and autonomous community of Asturias, in northern Spain.

The population is 77 (INE 2011).

Villages and hamlets
 Castañedo (Castañéu)
 Escoredo (Escoréu)
 La Pandiella
 Los Llanos
 Ocea (Ucea)
 La Vidur
 Villarigán

References

Parishes in Pravia